Crystal Lake is a small lake in Otsego County, New York. It is located west of Garrattsville. Crystal Lake drains south via an unnamed creek which flows into the Butternut Creek. Gross Hill is located north of Crystal Lake.

References 

Lakes of New York (state)
Lakes of Otsego County, New York